Blondie is a Swedish film from 2012 directed by Jesper Ganslandt. The main roles of the film are played by Marie Göranzon, Alexandra Dahlström, Helena af Sandeberg, Olle Sarri and Carolina Gynning. The film had its world premiere at the 69th Venice International Film Festival in 2012.

References

External links

Swedish drama films
2012 films
2010s Swedish films